Lous is a surname. Notable people with the surname include:

Andreas Lous (1728–1797), Danish naval officer
Georg Lous (1878–1949), Norwegian barrister and businessman
Georg Lous Jr. (1916–1996), Norwegian barrister
Karl Lous (1847–1928), Norwegian barrister
Kristian Lous (1875–1941), Norwegian astronomer